Salhöhe Pass (el. 779 m.) is a mountain pass in the Jura Mountains of Switzerland between Kienberg in the canton of Solothurn and Erlinsbach in the canton of Aargau.

It connects Kienberg in Solothurn and Erlinsbach in Aargau. The pass road has a maximum grade of 9 percent. Although it is the shortest route between Aarau and Basel, traffic over the pass is moderate.

After the Bern citizens had conquered the Unteraargau region in 1415, Salhöhe marked the border between the Old Swiss Confederacy and the Further Austrian possessions of the Habsburg dynasty.

Mountain passes of Switzerland
Mountain passes of the Jura
Mountain passes of Aargau
Mountain passes of the canton of Solothurn
Aargau–Solothurn border